Union Township is one of seven townships in Perry County, Indiana, United States. As of the 2010 census, its population was 557 and it contained 293 housing units.

History
The Rockhouse Cliffs Rock Shelters was listed on the National Register of Historic Places in 1986.

Geography

Unincorporated towns
 Derby at 
 Dexter at 
 Magnet at 
 Mount Pleasant at 
(This list is based on USGS data and may include former settlements.)

Cemeteries
The township contains these seven cemeteries: Badger, Derby, Horton, Old Chapel, Phelps, Stephenson and Talley.

Major highways
  Indiana State Road 37

School districts
 Perry Central Community School Corporation

Political districts
 State House District 73
 State House District 74
 State Senate District 47

References
 
 United States Census Bureau 2009 TIGER/Line Shapefiles
 IndianaMap

External links
 Indiana Township Association
 United Township Association of Indiana
 City-Data.com page for Union Township

Townships in Perry County, Indiana
Townships in Indiana